The Government of the Principality of Asturias, also known as the Council of Government of the Principality of Asturias is the executive branch of the General Junta of Asturias, one of the autonomous communities of Spain. It is responsible for the political action, reglementation and administration of the government of the autonomous region.

It has its headquarters in Oviedo.

Composition
The President of the Principality of Asturias is the head of government, elected by the members of the General Junta. He appoints one vice-president and the counselors. These ones can be members of the General Junta or not.

Current composition (Since 2019)

References

External links
Official website
Composition of the Government since 1982